Hélène Receveaux (born 28 February 1991) is a French judoka. She is the 2017 European bronze medalist in the 57 kg division.

References

External links
 

1991 births
French female judoka
Living people
Universiade medalists in judo
Universiade bronze medalists for France
Medalists at the 2011 Summer Universiade
Medalists at the 2013 Summer Universiade
21st-century French women